Charles Royle (17 January 1872 – 3 November 1963) was an English butcher and Liberal politician.

Family and education
Charles Royle was the son of Samuel and Mary Royle. He was educated at Portwood Wesleyan Higher Grade School. He married Maria, the daughter of Oliver Wolfe and they had four sons and two daughters. One of his sons was Charles Royle, who was Labour MP for West Salford

Career
After leaving school, Royle went straight to work in the meat trade, eventually qualifying as a master butcher. He gained the respect and confidence of his peers in the trade and became President of the National Federation of Meat Traders Associations, a position he held twice in 1929 and 1942.

Politics

Local politics
Royle had a long career in local government. He was a member of Stockport Town Council for 44 years in all, rising to be an Alderman and Mayor of the town four times. In 1947 he was made a freeman of the Borough of Stockport.

Parliament
Royle first stood for election to the House of Commons at the 1923 general election in Stockport. Stockport was a two-member seat. The two members since the by-election of 1920 caused by the death of one and the resignation of the other sitting Lloyd George Coalition government MPs had been the Conservative William Greenwood and the National Liberal Henry Fildes. At the 1923 general election Royle joined Fildes as the Liberal team to fight the two seats. This time Fildes was fighting as a Liberal without prefix or suffix. In the event Greenwood retained his seat for the Tories and Royle leapfrogged over Fildes to take the second seat for the Liberals.

At the 1924 general election however, Royle was unable to hold his seat. He shared the fight against two Conservatives with Labour candidate Arnold Townend but the Tories won both seats.

What the arrangement was between Royle and Fildes is uncertain but when Greenwood died on 19 August 1925 causing a by-election in Stockport it was Fildes rather than Royle who was adopted to fight the seat for the Liberals.  Townend fought again for Labour winning the contest and holding the seat until 1931.

Royle fought Stockport again, as a pair with Fildes, at the 1929 general election, although this time he was described on the ticket as an Independent Liberal. but he came bottom of the poll and lost his deposit.

Publication
In 1949, Royle published his autobiography, Opened Doors. It was published by the Meat Trades’ Journal Co, London.

Death
He died on 3 November 1963 aged 91.

References

External links 
 

1872 births
1963 deaths
Liberal Party (UK) MPs for English constituencies
UK MPs 1923–1924
People from Stockport
English butchers
Mayors of Stockport
Labour Party (UK) parliamentary candidates
Members of the Parliament of the United Kingdom for Stockport